Plecostachys is a genus of South African flowering plants in the family Asteraceae.

 Species
 Plecostachys polifolia (Thunb.) Hilliard & B.L.Burtt
 Plecostachys serpyllifolia (P.J.Bergius) Hilliard & B.L.Burtt

References

Gnaphalieae
Asteraceae genera
Endemic flora of South Africa